Zelkova × verschaffeltii (Dippel) G.Nicholson (cut-leaf zelkova) is a zelkova cultivar of hybrid origin. It was originally described in 1892 by Leopold Dippel from a cultivated plant as Zelkova japonica var. verschaffeltii, suggesting an eastern Asian origin. In 1896, George Nicholson raised it to species rank as Zelkova verschaffeltii, while its much closer similarity to Zelkova carpinifolia led Augustine Henry to suggest it might be a hybrid between Zelkova carpinifolia and Zelkova abelicea. More recent authors most widely regarded it as a cultivar, either not ascribed to any Zelkova species in particular, or placed under Z. carpinifolia with no suggestion of hybrid origin. Analysis of flavonoids has subsequently suggested that it is a hybrid between Zelkova carpinifolia and Zelkova serrata : "The chromatographic evidence would suggest that Z. X verschaffeltii is a hybrid between Z. carpinifolia and Z. serrata. Z. serrata was first introduced into England in 1861, and Z. verschaffeltii has been cultivated since 1886. It may well have been that some of the Z. serrata trees reached sexual maturity before 1886 and crossed with Z. carpinifolia already in cultivation. The fact that Z. X verschaffeltii is really a clone would indicate that such a cross might be a rare event, and our experience would tend to substantiate this hypothesis."

Name in error
The tree was originally misidentified as an elm. The putative cultivar Ulmus 'Pitteurs Pendula' was listed by C. de Vos  in Handboek Supplement 16, 1890, as Ulmus pitteursii pendula. However, Hans M. Heybroek, erstwhile head of the Dutch elm breeding programme at the de Dorschkamp Research Institute for Forestry and Landscape Planning at Wageningen, identified the tree as Zelkova × verschaffeltii.

Description
A large shrub or small, bushy-crowned tree < 15 m tall, with mottled grey and brown bark and graceful habit. The leaves are narrow, 3.5–8 cm long and 1.3–6.6 cm broad, deeply incised with between five and ten pairs of triangular teeth. The fruit is rarely produced, a small two-lobed dry nut-like drupe 4–5 mm diameter.

Cultivation
First found in cultivation in the van Houtte nursery at Ghent in Belgium before 1885.

Etymology
The tree is named for the Belgian botanist Ambroise Verschaffelt who owned the Verschaffelt Nursery in Ghent, later acquired by Jean Jules Linden, the renowned horticulturist and camellia specialist.

Accessions

Europe
Royal Botanic Garden Edinburgh, acc. no. 19531019 (15 m tall in 2004)
Sir Harold Hillier Gardens, acc. no. 1982.0194, as Z. carpinifolia 'Verschaffeltii'.
University of Copenhagen Botanic Garden, acc. no. P.1977-5020, as Z. carpinifolia 'Verschaffeltii'.
Icomb Place gardens, as Z. carpinifolia 'Verschaffeltii'.
Wijdemeren city counsel, The Netherlands, Kuijerpark, Nederhorst den Berg as Z x verschaffeltii

North America
Longwood Gardens, acc. no. 1992-0138, as Z. carpinifolia 'Verschaffeltii'.
New York Botanical Garden, acc. no. 2793/93, as Z. verschaffeltii.

Synonymy
Ulmus 'Pitteurs Pendula', in error.

References

verschaffeltii
Misidentified elm cultivar
Hybrid plants